The France women's national football team represents the nation of France in international women's association football. It is fielded by the French Football Federation (FFF), the governing body of football in France, and competes as a member of the UEFA.

The team played its first official international match under FFF jurisdiction on 17 April 1971 against the Netherlands. Since its first competitive match under the federation, more than 300 players have made at least official appearance for the team. On 11 May 2003, Corinne Diacre became the first player to play 100 official matches for the team. Since then, 15 other players have achieved this milestone.

List of players

Note: Players are listed by number of caps, then number of goals scored. Players are listed alphabetically if number of goals are equal.

See also 
 France women's national football team
 :Category:French women's footballers
 France women's national football team#Current squad

References

External links 
  Official site

 
France
International footballers
Women
international footballers
Association football player non-biographical articles